Argos Comunicación is a television and film production company owned by Epigmenio Ibarra based in Mexico City.

Profile
The company started as the telenovela-production unit for TV Azteca with Nada personal and has since then produced many telenovelas for this network. It also co-produced Sexo, pudor y lágrimas in 1999 directed by Antonio Serrano who has directed five telenovelas and another film (Lucía, Lucía) with Argos. In 2001, Argos signed a contract with Telemundo to produce telenovels for this network and has since then produced nine, including Gitanas. Argos also owns an acting school, CasAzul, a music unit, Argos Música, and a theater production unit, Argos Teatro. Most of the content produced by Argos is filmed in the majestic Estudios Churubusco that were used to produce all the films during the Mexican gold film era.

As of December 31, 2006 Argos will no longer be co-producing any new projects with Telemundo. Argos has made a deal with TV Azteca to start production of new content. They have Casablanca in pre-production which is slated to start sometime in February 2007. Argos will finish up the production of Marina and a few episodes of Decisiones with Telemundo. Also for 2007 Argos is producing a mini-series for HBO Latin America starring Ana de la Reguera.

Units
 Argos Comunicación, Argos Cine – Film
 Argos Música
 Argos Teatro
 CasAzul – Acting school

Zoom TV
 Zoom.tv (www.zoom.tv)
It started out as a website with original content, a reality show with fixed cameras in a real house called Inquilino. Visitors to this website were able to go into a chat room and talk live to the renters living in the house. It also had an internet radio station where Osvaldo Benavides hosted a weekend show.

Zoom TV was the precursor of what Argos' dubbed as "la tercera mirada" (the third look), a new television station, that would compete directly with the giant Televisa and TV Azteca (whom they had just broke ties with). It was in January 2002 when this new TV station would emerge, but legal issues prevented Argos from tubing and this venture as well as the website disappeared.

The programming was to be color-coded based on the content it was showing. For example, red was to be for adults only, while yellow was for the whole family. CEO of Argos, Epigmenio Ibarra does not lose hope that some day, he will have an output in his homeland Mexico, but for now he will only work as a content generator.

Film
 Cronica de Una Muerte Anunciada (2010)
 Fuera del cielo (2007)
 Lucía, Lucía (2003)
 Ladies' Night (2003)
 La habitación azul (2002)
 Vivir mata (2001)
 Nocturno chilango
 Sexo, pudor y lágrimas (1999)

Telenovelas
 Ingobernable (2017)
  Enemigo Íntimo (2017)
 El Chema (2016)
 La Doña (2016)
 Vuelve Temprano (2016)
 Los Miserables (2014)
 Señora Acero (2014)
 La Impostora (2014) 
 Camelia la Texana (2014)
 Fortuna (2013)
 El Señor de los Cielos (2013)
 La Patrona (2013)
 Rosa Diamante (2012)
 Último Año (2012)
 Infames (2012)
 El 8vo Mandamiento (2011)
 Bienvenida Realidad (2011)
 El Sexo Debil (2011)
 Las Aparicio (2010)
 Deseo Prohibido (2008)
 Vivir sin ti ↔ Vivir por ti (2008)
 Mientras Haya Vida (2007)
 Marina (2006)
 Corazón partido (2005)
 Los Plateados (2005)
 Gitanas (2004)
 Ladrón de corazones (2003)
 El alma herida (2003)
 Daniela (2002)
 Cara o cruz (2001)
 Todo por amor (2000)
 La vida en el espejo (1999)
 El amor de mi vida (1998)
 Demasiado corazón (1998)
 Tentaciones (1998)
 Mirada de mujer (1997)
 Nada personal (1996)

Mini-Series
 Capadocia (2007)
 Zapata: Amor en Rebeldía (2003)
 Feliz Navidad Mamá (2002)
 La Virgen de Guadalupe (2002)

Comedy
 Amor a las Carreras (2001)

Entertainment
 A dónde estás corazón (2001)
 Momento de decisión
 Se vale soñar

References

External links
  Interview with Epigmenio Ibarra
  Interview with Epigmenio Ibarra on todito.com
  Argos Comunicación Webpage

Companies based in Mexico City
Film production companies of Mexico
Mass media in Mexico City